Tindwende Sawadogo (born 22 July 1995) is a Burkinabé Olympic swimmer. He represented his country at the 2016 Summer Olympics in the Men's 50 metre freestyle event where he ranked at #67 with a time of 26.38 seconds. He did not advance to the semifinals. In 2019, he represented Burkina Faso at the 2019 African Games held in Rabat, Morocco.

References 

1995 births
Living people
Burkinabé male freestyle swimmers
Swimmers at the 2016 Summer Olympics
Olympic swimmers of Burkina Faso
Swimmers at the 2019 African Games
African Games competitors for Burkina Faso
21st-century Burkinabé people